Saxony Lutheran High School is a private, Lutheran Church–Missouri Synod high school located in Jackson, Missouri, United States.

Organization
The governing body of Saxony is a board of regents. This consists of two members from each participating Lutheran congregation. The board of regents appoints an executive board. Saxony Lutheran has four elementary feeder schools, and twenty-four associate Lutheran churches.

The school's facilities can accommodate 300 students, and had 226 students enrolled in the 2014–15 school year.  It is a coeducational school that educates in grades 9–12.

History
Saxony Lutheran High School was established in September 1999, holding classes in rented premises. The school bought a  parcel of land in Fruitland in January 2000, for $3,200,000. The current premises were opened, on that site, in the fall of 2004. In 2009, north-west and north-east wings were added to the building.

Athletics
Saxony is a member of the Missouri State High School Activities Association, which they joined in summer 2002. Their first athletic event, under the Association, was held on November 26, 2002. A new gymnasium was opened in November 2004. Teams use the mascot, and compete under the title, 'Crusaders'. The athletic activities that the school offers are baseball, boys basketball, boys soccer, cheer-leading, cross country, girls basketball, girls soccer, golf, softball, swimming, track, and volleyball.

References

External links
 

High schools in Cape Girardeau County, Missouri
Private high schools in Missouri
Lutheran schools in Missouri
Educational institutions established in 1999
1999 establishments in Missouri
Secondary schools affiliated with the Lutheran Church–Missouri Synod